Anthony S. Mrakovich (born January 5, 1999) is an American professional stock car racing driver. He last competed in the NASCAR Gander Outdoors Truck Series, driving for Tony Mrakovich Racing. He previously competed part-time in the NASCAR Xfinity Series, driving the No. 28 Ford Mustang for JGL Racing.

Racing career

Xfinity Series
Mrakovich made his Xfinity debut at Richmond in April 2018, driving the No. 28 Ford Mustang part-time for JGL Racing. He had previously supposed to debut at Bristol, but was replaced by Dylan Lupton after disappointing practices. Mrakovich finished 24th in his first Xfinity race after starting 35th.

Gander Outdoors Truck Series
On January 2, 2019, Mrakovich announced he will compete part-time in the NASCAR Gander Outdoors Truck Series under his team Tony Mrakovich Racing. He intended to debut at the first Martinsville race, but failed to qualify. He did qualify for the SpeedyCash.com 400 finishing 26th. Mrakovich also withdrew at Dover under his team Tony Mrakovich Racing. He drove to finishes of 12th and 13th at Pocono and Las Vegas for NEMCO Motorsports.

Motorsports career results

NASCAR
(key) (Bold – Pole position awarded by qualifying time. Italics – Pole position earned by points standings or practice time. * – Most laps led.)

Xfinity Series

Gander Outdoors Truck Series

ARCA Racing Series
(key) (Bold – Pole position awarded by qualifying time. Italics – Pole position earned by points standings or practice time. * – Most laps led.)

 Season still in progress
 Ineligible for series points

References

External links
 

Living people
1999 births
NASCAR drivers
Racing drivers from Pennsylvania
People from Elizabethtown, Pennsylvania
ARCA Menards Series drivers
NASCAR team owners